Roussel may refer to:

 Roussel (surname), including a list of people carrying the name
 Roussel (automobile), French automobile manufactured from 1908 to 1914
 Roussel Uclaf, a French pharmaceutical company

Places
 Big Roussel, the channel between Herm to the west, and Brecqhou and Sark to the east, in the Channel Islands
 Chérencé-le-Roussel, a commune in the Manche département, Normandy
 Little Roussel, the channel between Herm and Guernsey, in the Channel Islands

See also
 Bois Roussel (1935–1955), French racehorse
 Kirin-Amgen v Hoechst Marion Roussel, British court ruling (2004) concerning patents